William D. Jones (October 11, 1830 – June 18, 1905) was a member of the Wisconsin State Assembly.

Biography
Jones was born on October 11, 1830, in Salem Township, Westmoreland County, Pennsylvania. He was a miller by trade.

Assembly career
Jones was a member of the Assembly during the 1876 session. He was a Republican.

References

1830 births
1905 deaths
People from Westmoreland County, Pennsylvania
Republican Party members of the Wisconsin State Assembly
Millers
19th-century American politicians